Keep Me Crazy may refer to:

 "Keep Me Crazy" a 2013 single by Chris Wallace, from his album, Push Rewind
 "Keep Me Crazy" (Sheppard song), 2017